Centropyge potteri, commonly known as the russet angelfish, Potter's angelfish or Potter's pygmy angelfish, is a species of marine ray-finned fish, a marine angelfish belonging to the family Pomacanthidae. It is found in the central Pacific Ocean.

Description
Centropyge potteri''' has a bright orange body marked with thin vertical stripes which are blue to black in colour. The dorsal, caudal and anal fins have a vivid blue margin while the pectoral and pelvic fins are orange to bright yellow in colour. The males have a wider area of blue in the middle of the body which extends down on to the belly. There is a deep water vivid blue colour morph in which the stripe are black or purple that has black to burgundy stripes, which occurs at depths below .

DistributionCentropyge potteri is found in the central Pacific Ocean where it is found around the Hawaiian Islands and Johnston Atoll.

This species lives in areas of rock, coral or rubble on seaward reefs. It is a benthopelagic species which feeds on algae and detritus. They mnay live in small social groups, harems with a single male and up to 8 females. They are protogynous hermaphrodites and if no male is present the dominant female will change sex. Spawning takes place between December and May and usually occurs around nightfall. A spawning pair will select a high outcropping of rock in their territory to spawn over. The male initiates courtship by approaching the female and swimming alongside the female in a vertical position and using a smooth sinuous motion. He then moves to be above the female, halts, raises his dorsal and anal fin, starts to flutter the pectoral fins and makes a slight sideward turn before starting to drift slowly. If he does not elicit a response he will start again with the sinuous swimming notion, repeating until the female responds. When they are ready to mate the red colouration becomes more intense and the par make audible grunts and clicks. The male will then draw the female to the selected outcropping  and will continue the display around 90cm above it. When the female adopts the position that indicates she is ready to mate, the male briefly nuzzles her vent until she releases the eggs. The male then immediately releases his milt  and then both fish dive for cover, the female chasing the male and nipping at his caudal fin. They then go to their night time shelter.

SystematicsCentropyge potteri was first formally described in 1912 by the American ichthyologists David Starr Jordan (1851-1931) and Charles William Metz (1889-1975) with the type locality given as Honolulu on Oahu. The specific name honours Frederick A. Potter the first director of the Waikiki Aquarium who held the post from 1904 to 1940. Some authorities place this species in the subgenus Centropyge.

UtilisationCentropyge potteri'' appears in the aquarium trade.

References

potteri
Endemic fauna of Hawaii
Fish of Hawaii
Fish described in 1912
Taxa named by David Starr Jordan